The first revenue stamp of Colombia was issued on 1 September 1858, one year before the first Colombian postage stamp.

Granadine Confederation
The first Colombian revenue stamp was a black 20 centavos value for the Granadine Confederation.

United States of New Granada
In 1861 a 20c stamp was issued inscribed Estados Unidos de Nueva Granada, or the United States of New Granada.

United States of Colombia
Later in 1861 the United States of New Granada became the United States of Colombia and stamps were issued marked Estados Unidos de Colombia from 1864.

Republic of Colombia
The Republic of Colombia was created in 1886 and revenue stamps marked Republica de Colombia were issued from 1887.

Colombian states
The constituent states of Colombia also issued their own revenue stamps.

See also
Alan D. Anyon
Postage stamps and postal history of Colombia

References

External links
Tax Stamps Collection

Taxation in Colombia
Philately of Colombia
Colombia